Live in Japan 1978: Dear John C. is a live album by drummer Elvin Jones' Jazz Machine recorded in Japan in 1978 and originally released on the Japanese Trio label.

Reception
The Allmusic review states "The music is a direct outgrowth of drummer Elvin Jones' days with Coltrane. Bassist Andy McCloud is steady and supportive throughout while guitarist Roland Prince supplies a chordal base for the tenors. The musicians stretch themselves within the boundaries of Coltrane's music".

Track listing
 "E. J.'s Blues" (Elvin Jones) - 15:27 
 "House That Love Built" (Frank Foster) - 10:25 
 "A Love Supreme: Part 1: Acknowledgement/Part 2: Resolution" (John Coltrane) - 26:45

Personnel
Elvin Jones  - drums
Pat LaBarbera - tenor saxophone
Frank Foster - tenor saxophone, soprano saxophone
Roland Prince - guitar 
Andy McCloud - bass

References

Elvin Jones live albums
1978 live albums